Brooklyn United may refer to:
 Brooklyn Northern United AFC
 Brooklyn United (film): a 2014 short film by Tracey Anarella